The streak-throated canastero (Asthenes humilis) is a species of bird in the family Furnariidae. It is found in Bolivia and Peru. Its natural habitat is subtropical or tropical high-altitude grassland. Three subspecies are recognized:
Asthenes humilis cajamarcae Zimmer, JT, 1936 - northwestern Peru
Asthenes humilis humilis (Cabanis, 1873) - central Peru
Asthenes humilis robusta (von Berlepsch, 1901) - southern Peru and northern Bolivia

References

streak-throated canastero
Birds of the Peruvian Andes
Birds of the Bolivian Andes
streak-throated canastero
Taxonomy articles created by Polbot